Thom Green (born 4 September 1991) is an Australian actor and dancer who is best known for his role as Sammy in the ABC series Dance Academy, the lead role in Camp as Kip Wampler, and as Thomas Lasky in the Halo 4: Forward Unto Dawn web series. Green also starred in the 2015 film Downriver.

Career
Beginning his professional career in 2007, his first role was in the Network Ten telemovie Emerald Falls alongside actors Vince Colosimo, Georgie Parker and Catherine McClements. He also made his stage debut in 2007 playing Phillip in Lockie Leonard with the Merrigong Theatre Company.

In 2008, he starred in two Australian short films, Vafadar and  The Ground Beneath.  For The Ground Beneath, he received a nomination at the 2008 AFI Awards and won the Best Actor award in 2009 at the St Kilda Film Festival.

In 2009 he starred in Voyeurnet, in a 19-episode role as Dexter Walker in Home and Away, and in the feature film Beneath Hill 60. Green began filming on the television series Dance Academy on 13 July 2009. In 2009, Green also acted in a theatre production of The Nargun and the Stars for the Perth International Arts Festival and the Sydney Festival.

In 2012, Green starred in the Robert Carter drama, Thirst, alongside Hanna Mangan-Lawrence, Myles Pollard and Victoria Haralabidou. Green also performed in his first American production, Halo 4: Forward Unto Dawn, a webseries based on the bestselling series of games.

Filmography

Theatre

Awards and nominations

References

External links

1991 births
Australian male child actors
Australian male stage actors
Australian male television actors
Male actors from Sydney
Living people